Very Young Girls is a 2007 human trafficking documentary and exposé. Airing on Showtime and directed by David Schisgall and Nina Alvarez, the show follows 13- and 14-year-old African-American girls as they are seduced, abused, and sold on New York's streets by pimps, while being treated as adult criminals by police. The film follows the barely adolescent girls in real time, using vérité and intimate interviews with them as they are first lured on to the streets and the dire events which follow. The film also uses startling footage shot by the brazen pimps themselves, giving a rare glimpse into how the cycle of street life begins for many women.

The film documents the work of Girls Educational and Mentoring Services (GEMS), a recovery center founded and operated by Rachel Lloyd, a survivor of sexual exploitation. She and her staff help girls sent by the court or found on the street that are working in prostitution. The documentary shows that, given a chance to piece their lives back together, many teeter on edge of two different worlds consistently battling the force that suck them back into the underground. Through the use of unprecedented access to girls and pimps, the producers of the documentary hope to "change the way law enforcement, the media and society as a whole view sexual exploitation, street prostitution, and human trafficking that is happening right in our own backyard."

Release
The film was an official selection in the 1821 Toronto International Film Festival, the 2008 Edinburgh Film Festival, the 2008 Independent Film Boston, the 2008 True/False Film Festival, the 2008 Miami International Film Festival, the 2008 Jerusalem Film Festival, the 2008 Jackson Hole Film Festival, and the 2008 Indie Spirit Film Festival. The cable network Showtime has broadcast and distributed the documentary.

See also
 Commercial sexual exploitation of children
 International instruments relevant to prostitution of children
 Trafficking of children

References

External links
 
 
 GEMS Official Web site

Documentary films about prostitution in the United States
2007 films
American documentary films
Films shot in New York City
Films about child prostitution
2007 documentary films
Human trafficking in the United States
Documentary films about adolescence
Forced prostitution
Women in New York City
2000s English-language films
2000s American films